Park Kyong-ni Prize (Korean: 박경리 문학상) is an international literary award based in South Korea. It was established in 2011 in honor of Park Kyung-ni, known for her series Toji. The award was founded and sponsored by the Toji Foundation of Culture. 

According to Complete Review, it was established to be the primary international literary award of South Korea. With a cash prize of $100,000 it is one of the richest literary prizes in the world.

Winners

2011 Choi In-hun
2012 Ludmila Ulitskaya, Daniel Stein, interpreter
2013 Marilynne Robinson
2014 Bernhard Schlink
2015 Amos Oz
2016 Ngũgĩ wa Thiong'o
2017 A. S. Byatt
2018 Richard Ford
2019 Ismail Kadare
2020 Yun Heunggil

References

International literary awards
South Korean literary awards
Awards established in 2011
2011 establishments in South Korea